Dennis Chew Chong Kheng (born 15 August 1973), also known as Zhou Chongqing, is a Singaporean radio deejay, actor, variety show host and singer. Chew is known for playing Aunty Lucy, a character which requires him to cross-dress as a middle-aged woman in the variety show Paris and Milan.

Early life and education
Chew studied at the former Pearl's Hill Primary School and Tuan Mong High School (predecessor of Ngee Ann Secondary School). At 13, Chew performed in the musical and children's television programme 《成语50》(Chinese Idioms 50). At 14, he was talent scouted for a commercial for Yakult because of his cute looks. He was part of the first batch of students in the teen acting classes organised by the Singapore Broadcasting Corporation during the late 1980s. In 1991, he played a substantial role in the TV drama The Future is Mine (锦绣前程).

After serving his National Service, Chew went on to Shatec to get a Diploma in Hotel Management as he realised during NS that it is important to further his studies.

In April 2022, Chew returned to study and enrolled in Ngee Ann Polytechnic to pursue a diploma in Chinese Media and Communication.

Career
Chew became a Chinese teacher in Yumin Primary School and Raffles Girls' Primary School after completing his education. At the same time, he also worked as a part-time DJ at local radio station YES 933. A few years later, he signed on as a full-time DJ with YES 933.

In Jan 2005, Chew released a music album, containing nine original songs.

Chew's big break in television came in 2009 when he portrayed Aunty Lucy in the variety show Paris and Milan (女王本色), which also starred Patricia Mok, Michelle Tay and Ben Yeo. His performance was extremely well received by both young and old, earning him popularity which led to his first ever win (Top 10 Most Popular Male Artistes Award) at the annual Star Awards in 2010. The character's catchphrase "Aiyoh, so embarrassing!" and the swooshing of his head to the right was popular with audiences. "Aunty Lucy" was also featured in films like Aunty Lucy Slam Dunk (Auntie Lucy 也灌篮) (2009), It's a Great, Great World (大世界) (2011) and Dance Dance Dragon (龙众舞) (2012), and the game show We Are Singaporeans (season 1 - 2011) as a guest. Chew later stated in an interview that the success of Aunty Lucy was a major turning point in his career, and the endorsement deals it brought helped him clear debts which he had incurred from an unsuccessful business venture.

While juggling DJ duties, Chew also hosts many different programmes ranging from roadshows, variety programmes and game shows, and starred in several television series. He had also participated in several local productions and films. These include the 881 The Musical, in which he played the role of an evil artiste manager. In February 2013, Chew finalised his plans to move over to Love 97.2FM in mid-March as DJ, after hosting at YES 93.3FM for 20 years.

In 2019, Chew appeared in a advertisement by e-payments website epaysg.com, where he portrayed characters such as a woman in a tudung and a man with visibly darker skin. Broadcaster Mediacorp, through its celebrity management wing, later apologized for the controversial ad and the epaysg.com website has also removed it.

Chew has gotten 10 out of 10 Top 10 Most Popular Male Artistes from 2010–2013, 2016–2019, 2021 respectively.

Filmography

Television host
Celebrity Squares《名人 tic tac toe》常驻嘉宾  (2001)
One Fun Day《惊喜一整天》(2001 - 2002) (with Dasmond Koh, Florence Tan, Mark Lee, Patricia Mok)
One Fun Day II《惊喜一整天》II (2002) (with Dasmond Koh, Florence Tan, Mark Lee, Patricia Mok)
Innocent Moments 《小小儿戏》(2002 - 2003) (with Fiona Xie)
Singapore Hit Awards 新加坡金曲奖颁奖典礼 (2002)
Singapore Hit Awards 新加坡金曲奖颁奖典礼 (2003)
Durian Delights《我吃，你吃，它刺刺刺》(2004) (with Huang Wenyong)
Singapore Hit Awards 新加坡金曲奖颁奖典礼 (2004)
Singapore Hit Awards 新加坡金曲奖颁奖典礼 (2005)
Kungfu Chef《神厨双怪》(2006) (with Chew Chor Meng)
SuperBand (Season 1)《非常Superband》常驻评判 (2006)
Fact Or Fiction?《真相大点击》(2006) (with Kym Ng)
Stock Exchange《好货上门》(2006) (with Patricia Mok)
Singapore Hit Awards 新加坡金曲奖颁奖典礼 (2006)
Singapore Hit Awards 新加坡金曲奖颁奖典礼 (2007)
F&B Heroes《餐饮英雄榜》(2008)
Buzzing Cashier《抢摊大行动》(2008) (with Kym Ng & Quan Yi Fong)
Singapore Hit Awards 新加坡金曲奖颁奖典礼 (2008)
Buzzing Cashier II《抢摊大行动 II》(2009) (with Kym Ng & Quan Yi Fong)
Paris and Milan (2009)
Singapore Hit Awards 新加坡金曲奖颁奖典礼 (2009)
Black Rose (2010)
Gatekeepers (2010)
Star Awards 2010 红星大奖 (Show 1) (2010)
Singapore Hit Awards 新加坡金曲奖颁奖典礼 (2010)
Small and Beautiful (2011) (channel 5)
Singapore Hit Awards 新加坡金曲奖颁奖典礼 (2011)
Black Rose II (2014)
Halloween Singapore Remake of Comic《中华英雄》(2015)
Star Awards 2016 红星大奖 (2016)
Dennis Uncovers 周公找茶 (2018)
The Love 97.2 Breakfast Quartet 《玉建煌崇电视版2》 (2018) (with Mark Lee & Marcus Chin)
Kids《看招》(2021)
Eat Eat Lok Lok《吃吃乐乐》(2021)
Goggles Life 3 (2021)

Film

Television

Compilation album

Awards and nominations

References

External links
Profile on xinmsn

Living people
Singaporean people of Teochew descent
Singaporean television personalities
Singaporean male film actors
Singaporean male television actors
20th-century Singaporean male actors
21st-century Singaporean male actors
Singaporean DJs
1973 births